Arnaud De Lie (born 16 March 2002) is a Belgian cyclist, who currently rides for UCI WorldTeam , having been promoted from the  team at the end of the 2021 season.

Career
De Lie opened his first professional season with the Vuelta a Mallorca races. He finished 71st and 117th in the first two races and won the fourth race Trofeo Playa de Palma in a bunch sprint against Juan Sebastián Molano, his first professional victory.

He scored many points in the battle to avoid relegation but his team was relegated to the second division.

Major results

2019
 1st  Road race, National Junior Road Championships
 1st Vlaams-Brabantse Pijl
 5th Trofeo Comune di Vertova
 7th Paris–Roubaix Juniors
 7th La Route des Géants
 8th E3 BinckBank Classic Junioren
2020
 1st  Overall La Philippe Gilbert Juniors
1st  Mountains classification
1st Stage 1
 3rd  Road race, UEC European Junior Road Championships
 7th Kuurne–Brussels–Kuurne Juniors
2021
 1st  Overall Okolo Jižních Čech
1st  Points classification
1st  Young rider classification
1st Stage 2
 1st Omloop Het Nieuwsblad Beloften
 Tour Alsace
1st  Points classification
1st Stages 2 & 5
 1st Stage 2 Circuit des Ardennes International
 9th Paris–Tours Espoirs
2022
 1st Trofeo Playa de Palma
 1st Grote Prijs Jean-Pierre Monseré
 1st Volta Limburg Classic
 1st Grote Prijs Marcel Kint
 1st Heistse Pijl
 1st Ronde van Limburg
 1st Schaal Sels
 1st Egmont Cycling Race
 1st Stage 3 Tour de Wallonie
 2nd Omloop van het Houtland
 3rd Nokere Koerse
 3rd Veenendaal–Veenendaal Classic
 4th Bretagne Classic
 4th Tro-Bro Léon
 5th Paris–Chauny
 6th Dwars door het Hageland
 6th Circuit Franco–Belge
 6th Polynormande
 6th Gooikse Pijl
 7th Eschborn–Frankfurt
 8th Classic Brugge–De Panne
 8th Paris–Bourges
 9th Bredene Koksijde Classic
 10th Le Samyn
2023
 1st Clàssica Comunitat Valenciana 1969
 2nd Omloop Het Nieuwsblad
 2nd Clásica de Almería
 7th Overall Étoile de Bessèges
1st  Points classification
1st Stages 1 & 3
 7th Kuurne–Brussels–Kuurne

Classics results timeline

References

External links

2002 births
Living people
Belgian male cyclists
Cyclists from Luxembourg (Belgium)
21st-century Belgian people
People from Libramont-Chevigny